The Lea Bailey Light Railway is a  narrow-gauge heritage railway in the United Kingdom. It is built on the site of the Bailey Level Gold Mine

An attempt was made in 2003 by the owners of Clearwell Caves to open the mine as a tourist attraction, but this was ultimately unsuccessful. In 2012, a small group from the Royal Forest of Dean Caving Club discovered the mine and a quantity of disused railway equipment and proposed to the owners that a volunteer-led project could start work on restoring the site. As of 2014, two locomotives and a number of wagons have been moved to Lea Bailey from storage at Clearwell Caves or the nearby Hawthorn Tunnel.

Part of the railway is laid on the trackbed of the disused Mitcheldean Road & Forest of Dean Junction Railway.

In 2013 the Lea Bailey Light Railway Society was formed; its members act as volunteers, undertaking all aspects of work on the site. A regular free newsletter is produced and sent out by e-mail.

Locomotives

Gallery

References

External links

Website of the Lea Bailey Light Railway
Lea Bailey Light Railway on Facebook

2 ft gauge railways in England
Rail transport in Gloucestershire
Rail transport in Herefordshire